There have been three producers of Blake's 7 audio dramas: BBC Radio, B7 Productions and Big Finish Productions.

BBC Radio
In 1998, the series returned to the BBC on the radio. The stories are set between the season D episodes "Stardrive" and "Animals". They were broadcast on BBC Radio 4. The roles of Dayna and Soolin, played by Josette Simon and Glynis Barber in the TV series, have been recast with Angela Bruce and Paula Wilcox.

In 2006, B7 Productions announced that it had recorded a series of 36 five-minute audio adventures. The new series was broadcast on BBC Radio 7 as three hour-long episodes.

The Early Years
B7 Productions also produced series of 30-minute prequel audio episodes, which explored the earlier histories of the central characters. These were broadcast on BBC Radio 4 Extra from 2010.

BBC Audiobooks
Audiobook readings novelising episodes from season A of the TV series released by BBC Audio.

The Liberator Chronicles
A series of enhanced audiobooks from Big Finish Productions with members of the TV series reprising their roles.

The Classic Audio Adventures
A series of full cast dramas from Big Finish Productions with members of the TV series reprising their roles.

Special (2013)
A 60 minute special was released in January 2013. It takes place between season B and C of the TV series, directly between the events of "Star One" and "Aftermath". The roles of Zen and Orac, voiced by Peter Tuddenham in the TV series, has been recast with Alistair Lock. It was also released by Big Finish Productions as an eBook in February 2013.

Series 1 (2014)
The first series consisting of six 60 minute episodes were released monthly from January 2014 to June 2014. They are set during season B of the TV series, between "Voice from the Past" and "Gambit". A story arc running across the six episodes concerns the Liberator crew pausing their quest for Star One to track down the Federation's new experimental Orac-type computer. It also features the introduction of the President, portrayed by Hugh Fraser, a character who was mentioned but never seen in the original series.

Series 2 (2014 - 2015)
A second series consisting of six 60 minute episodes were released monthly from November 2014 to April 2015. They are set during season C of the TV series, some time after "Rumours of Death" following on from the Liberator Chronicles volumes 3 and 9. A story arc running across the six episodes concerns the disappearance and subsequent search for Dayna. It sees the return of Tom Chadbon as Del Grant who appeared in the season B episode "Countdown".

Series 3: The Spoils of War (2017)
A third series, titled "The Spoils of War", consisting of four 60 minute episodes was released as a boxset in July 2017. They are set during season C of the TV series, with the first two episodes taking place after "Powerplay" and the third and fourth episodes set after "Rumours of Death". The role of Dayna, played by Josette Simon in the TV series, has been recast with Yasmin Bannerman.

Series 4: Crossfire (2017 - 2018)
The fourth series, titled "Crossfire", consisting of twelve 60 minute episodes was released across 3 box sets from October 2017 to April 2018. They are set during season C of the TV series, between "Death-Watch" and "Terminal". A story arc running across the twelve episodes concerns the attempts of Servalan's predecessor to regain the presidency of the Federation.

Special: The Way Ahead (2018) 
A 40th anniversary special, titled "The Way Ahead", consisting of two linked 60 minute episodes was released in January 2018. The first episode takes place during season A of the TV series, some time between "Project Avalon" and "Deliverance". The second episode takes place during season C of the TV series, some time around "Rumours of Death". A framing device, using continuity established by Paul Darrow's trilogy of "Lucifer" novels, is set some time after season D of the TV series. The role of Avalon, played by Julia Vidler in the TV series, has been recast with Olivia Poulet.

Series 5: Restoration (2019 - 2020)
A fifth series, titled "Restoration", consisting of twelve episodes was released across three box sets beginning in January 2019 and ending in February 2020 the main storyline concerning the urgent repairs to the Liberator after being badly damaged and the return of The President's rule over The Federation.

The Worlds of Blake's 7
A series of full cast boxsets taking place away from The Liberator consisting of three stories each.

Books

New standalone Blake's 7 novels set throughout seasons A, B, and C. Some are accompanied by audiobook versions. #9, #10 and #11 are audiobook only.

Lucifer Trilogy

These form a trilogy of audiobook releases written and read by Paul Darrow taking place 20 years after season D of the TV series.

Awards and nominations

See also
Kaldor City

References

Blake's 7
BBC Radio 4 Extra programmes
Big Finish Productions
Lists of plays